Severino Vasconcelos Barbosa (born September 24, 1951 in Olinda, Pernambuco, Brazil) is a former Brazilian naturalized Chilean footballer who has played for clubs in Brazil, Chile and Ecuador.

Career
He played for Chilean sides Colo-Colo, Universidad de Chile and Palestino, before retiring and becoming a coach. He managed Ecuadorian side Deportivo Quevedo during 2005.

Teams
  Íbis 1970
   1971–1972
  Alecrim 1973
  Náutico 1974
  Palmeiras 1975–1976
  Internacional 1977–1978
  America-RJ 1978
  Colo-Colo 1979–1985
  Barcelona SC 1985–1986
  Deportes La Serena 1987–1988
  Universidad de Chile 1989
  Palestino 1990–1993

Titles
  Colo-Colo 1979, 1981 and 1983 (Primera División)
  Colo-Colo 1981 and 1982 (Copa Chile)
  Universidad de Chile 1989 Primera B
  Barcelona SC 1985 (Primera División)

References

External links
Profile at Globo Esporte's Futpedia
Profile at dalealbo.cl
Severino Vasconcelos at PlaymakerStats 

1950 births
Living people
People from Olinda
Sportspeople from Pernambuco
Brazilian footballers
Brazilian expatriate footballers
Alecrim Futebol Clube players
Clube Náutico Capibaribe players
Sociedade Esportiva Palmeiras players
Sport Club Internacional players
America Football Club (RJ) players
Colo-Colo footballers
Barcelona S.C. footballers
Deportes La Serena footballers
Universidad de Chile footballers
Club Deportivo Palestino footballers
Campeonato Brasileiro Série A players
Chilean Primera División players
Primera B de Chile players
Brazilian expatriate sportspeople in Chile
Brazilian expatriate sportspeople in Ecuador
Expatriate footballers in Chile
Expatriate footballers in Ecuador
Association football midfielders
Brazilian emigrants to Chile
Naturalized citizens of Chile
Brazilian football managers
Chilean football managers
Brazilian expatriate football managers
Chilean expatriate football managers
Chilean expatriate sportspeople in Ecuador
Expatriate football managers in Ecuador